Derrick Moore (born December 6, 2002) is an American football defensive end for the Michigan Wolverines.

Early years and high school career
Moore was born in 2002. He attended Saint Frances Academy in Baltimore. He was rated by ESPN as the No. 22 football recruit in the 2022 recruiting class.

After his senior year, he was invited to play in the Under Armour All-America Game. He recorded two sacks and multiple quarterback pressures and was selected as the game's most valuable player.

College career
Moore had initially committed to Oklahoma but decommitted after Lincoln Riley left the program. He received offers from Alabama, Georgia, Ohio State and others. In December 2021, he committed to Michigan.

In January 2022, Moore enrolled at Michigan as an early enrollee. In April 2022, after seeing Moore play in spring practice, Michigan head coach Jim Harbaugh called him "a fantastic player" and "really gifted athletically and strength."

References

External links
 Michigan Wolverines bio

2002 births
Living people
American football defensive ends
Michigan Wolverines football players
Players of American football from Maryland